Molly Kathleen Dunsworth (born May 25, 1990) is a Canadian actress. She is best known for her starring role in the Canadian feature film Hobo with a Shotgun, in which she plays "Abby" alongside Rutger Hauer.

Early life
Dunsworth grew up in Halifax, Nova Scotia, and is the youngest daughter of actor John Dunsworth and the sister of actress Sarah E. Dunsworth, both known for their involvement in the Trailer Park Boys franchise.

Hobo with a Shotgun
Hobo with a Shotgun was the first feature film Dunsworth had a starring role in. Dunsworth co-stars in the film, alongside Rutger Hauer, in the role of Abby, a "hooker with a heart of gold". The film premiered at Sundance Film Festival on January 21, 2011, in the Park City at Midnight category and was released in theatres across Canada on March 25, 2011.

Filmography

See also
 List of former child actors from Canada

References

External links

1990 births
Living people
Actresses from Halifax, Nova Scotia
Canadian film actresses
Canadian television actresses